Jôdi Tor Dak Shune Keu Na Ase Tôbe Ekla Chôlo Re ("If no one responds to your call, then go your own way alone"), commonly known as Ekla Chôlo Re, is a Bengali patriotic song written by Rabindranath Tagore in 1905.

Originally titled as "EKLA", the song was first published in the September 1905 issue of Bhandar magazine. It was influenced by Harinaam Diye Jagat Matale Amar Ekla Nitai Re, a popular Bengali Kirtan song of Dhapkirtan or Manoharshahi gharana praising Nityananda, disciple of Chaitanya Mahaprabhu. Ekla Chalo Re was incorporated in the "Swadesh" (Homeland) section of Tagore's lyrical anthology Gitabitan.

The song exhorts the listener to continue their journey, despite abandonment or lack of support from others. It is often quoted in the context of sociopolitical change movements and was a favourite of Mahatma Gandhi.

Lyrics

Bengali
The verses of Ekla Chalo Re read as follows:

যদি তোর ডাক শুনে কেউ না আসে তবে একলা চলো রে।
একলা চলো একলা চলো একলা চলো একলা চলো রে॥

যদি কেউ কথা না কয়, ওরে ওরে ও অভাগা,
যদি সবাই থাকে মুখ ফিরায়ে সবাই করে ভয়—
তবে পরান খুলে
ও তুই মুখ ফুটে তোর মনের কথা একলা বলো রে॥

যদি সবাই ফিরে যায়, ওরে ওরে ও অভাগা,
যদি গহন পথে যাবার কালে কেউ ফিরে না চায়—
তবে পথের কাঁটা
ও তুই রক্তমাখা চরণতলে একলা দলো রে॥

যদি আলো না ধরে, ওরে ওরে ও অভাগা,
যদি ঝড়-বাদলে আঁধার রাতে দুয়ার দেয় ঘরে—
তবে বজ্রানলে
আপন বুকের পাঁজর জ্বালিয়ে নিয়ে একলা জ্বলো রে॥

Roman transliteration
Jodi tor dak shune keu na ashe tobe ekla cholo re.
Tobe ekla cholo, ekla cholo, ekla cholo, ekla cholo re.

Jodi keu kotha na koe, ore ore o obhaga,
Jodi shobai thake mukh phirae shobai kore bhoe, jodi shobai thake mukh phirae shobai kore bhoi—
Tobe poran khule
O tui mukh phute tor moner kotha ekla bolo re.

Jodi shobai phire jae, ore ore o obhaga,
Jodi gohon pothe jabar kale keu phire na chae, jodi gohon pothe jabar kale keu phire naa chai—
Tobe pother kata
O tui roktomakha chorontole ekla dolo re.

Jodi alo na dhore, ore ore o obhaga,
Jodi jhor-badole adhar rate duar dae ghore—
Tobe bojranole
Apon buker pajor jalie nie ekla jolo re.

English

If they answer not to thy call walk alone,
If they are afraid and cower mutely facing the wall,
O thou unlucky one,
open thy mind and speak out alone.

If they turn away, and desert you when crossing the wilderness,
O thou unlucky one,
trample the thorns under thy tread,
and along the blood-lined track travel alone.

If they do not hold up the light when the night is troubled with storm,
O thou unlucky one,
with the thunder flame of pain ignite thy own heart
and let it burn alone.

History

Writing 
"Ekla Chalo Re" was written at Giridih town in modern-day Jharkhand, India. It was one of the 22 protest songs written during the Swadeshi period of Indian freedom movement and along with "Amar Sonar Bangla", it became one of the key songs for the Anti-Partition Movement in Bengal Presidency in 1905.
 
Titled as "Eka" ("Alone") the song was first published in the September 1905 issue of Bhandar magazine. "Eka" was first included in Tagore's song anthology Baul in 1905. In 1941, it was incorporated into the "Swadesh" ("Homeland") section of Gitabitan, the complete anthology of Tagore's music.

The musical notation of "Ekla Chalo Re" was prepared by Indira Devi, a niece of Tagore. The notation was first published in the April–May 1906 issue of Sangeet-Vignan Prakashika magazine and later incorporated into the 46th volume of Swarabitan, the complete collection of Tagore's musical notations.

Recording
"Ekla Chalo Re" was first recorded by Rabindranath Tagore sometime between 1905 and 1908. The cylinder record labelled H. Bose Swadeshi Records is now lost. Two other records of the song made by Harendranath Dutta (record no P5270) and Hindustan Party (comprising Amala Dutta, Nandita Devi, Sudhin Dutta and Santidev Ghosh) (record no H 191) are released by Gramophone Company of India and Hindustan Records respectively.

Eminent Rabindra Sangeet singer Suchitra Mitra recorded this song twice, first in 1948 (record no N27823), for the film Sandipan Pathshala, then in 1984 (record no PSPL 1501). There is also a third recording of this song by Suchitra Mitra from the album Rupantori (1988). She also recorded the song for the fourth time, with the said being played as background music, by Ustad Amjad Ali Khan, from the album Tribute to Tagore.

In popular culture

In 2004, "Ekla Chalo Re"'s tune was used with Hindi lyrics composed by A.R Rahman and sung by Sonu Nigam in the movie Netaji Subhas Chandra Bose: The Forgotten Hero. In the 2012 Bollywood film Kahaani, it is sung by actor Amitabh Bachchan under music direction of Vishal–Shekhar. Earlier, it was sung by Kishore Kumar, under the direction of Hemanta Mukhopadhyay. It was recorded by Hemanta Mukherjee in 1989.

References

External links
 যদি তোর ডাক শুনে কেউ না আসে Audio from calcuttaweb.com

Bengali-language literature
Indian poems
Indian literature
Songs written by Rabindranath Tagore
Bengali-language songs
Indian patriotic songs
Protest songs
Manna Dey songs
Kishore Kumar songs
Shreya Ghoshal songs
Amitabh Bachchan songs
1905 songs
Poems by Rabindranath Tagore
Rabindra Sangeet